Congress Poland was subdivided several times from its creation in 1815 until its dissolution in 1918. Congress Poland ("Russian Poland") was divided into departments, a relic from the times of the French-dominated Duchy of Warsaw. In 1816 the administrative divisions were changed to forms that were more traditionally Polish: voivodeships, obwóds and powiats. Following the November Uprising, the subdivisions were again changed in 1837 to bring the subdivisions closer to the structure of the Russian Empire when guberniyas (governorates) were introduced. In this way, Congress Poland was gradually transformed into the "Vistulan Country". Over the next several decades, various smaller reforms were carried out, either changing the smaller administrative units or merging/splitting various guberniyas.

Subdivisions in modern Lithuania

Today, almost all of the subdivisions of Congress Poland may be found, in similar territorial areas, in modern Poland. A few, roughly in the northern panhandle of Congress Poland, are to be found in modern Lithuania. They are:
 In Marijampolė County: Kalvarija Municipality, Marijampolė Municipality, Šakiai District Municipality (formerly Vladislavov), Vilkaviškis District Municipality (formerly Volkovyshki), and the town of Kybartai
 In Alytus County: Alytus District Municipality (formerly part of Kalvaria district), Lazdijai District Municipality (formerly part of Seyny district), and Merkinė (formerly part of Seyny district), a town near the Dzūkija National Park

Changes in subdivisions by period

From 1816 to 1837
On January 16, 1816, the areas of administrative jurisdiction were reformed from the departments of the Duchy of Warsaw into the more traditionally Polish voivodeships, obwóds and powiats. Eight voivodeships were created:

 Augustów Voivodeship (capital in Suwałki)
 Kalisz Voivodeship
 Kraków Voivodeship (despite the name of this province, the city of Kraków was not included; Kraków was a free city until the Kraków Uprising of 1846, after which it was annexed by Austria; the capital was first Miechów, then Kielce).
 Lublin Voivodeship
 Mazowsze Voivodeship (capital in Warsaw)
 Płock Voivodeship
 Podlasie Voivodeship (capital in Siedlce)
 Sandomierz Voivodeship (capital in Radom)

From 1837 to 1842
On 7 March 1837 the voivodeships were reorganised as eight guberniyas (governorates):
 Augustów Governorate (with capital in Łomża)
 Kalish Governorate (with capital in Kalisz)
 Krakov Governorate (with capital in Kielce)
 Lublin Governorate (with capital in Lublin)
 Masovia Governorate (with capital in Warsaw)
 Plotsk Governorate (with capital in Płock)
 Podlyase Governorate (with capital in Siedlce)
 Sandomir Governorate (with capital in Radom)

From 1842 to 1844
In 1842 the Polish powiats were renamed to okręgs  and the Polish obwóds were renamed powiats.

From 1844 to 1867
In 1844 several governorates were merged with others, and some others renamed. Five governorates remained:

From 1867 to 1893
The 1867 reform, initiated after the failure of the January Uprising, was designed to tie Congress Poland (now de facto the Vistulan Country) more tightly to the administration structure of the Russian Empire. It divided larger governorates into smaller ones. A new lower level entity, gmina, was introduced. This time ten governorates were formed:

From 1893 to 1912
A minor reform of 1893 transferred some territory from the Plotsk and Lomzha Governorates to the Warsaw Governorate.

From 1912 to 1919
The 1912 reform created a new governorate – Kholm Governorate – from parts of the Sedlets and Lublin Governorates. However this was split off from the Vistulan Country and made part of the Southwestern Krai of the Russian Empire.

External links
 What is the history of the gubernias of Poland?
  Zygmunt Gloger, Geografia historyczna ziem dawnej Polski, Rodział 15: W wieku XIX

Congress Poland
 
Congress Poland
Former subdivisions of Poland